Collins Chabane Local Municipality is a local municipality of South Africa. It was established after the August 2016 local elections by the merging of portions of two local municipalities: Thulamela and Makhado. Malamulele is the seat of the municipality.

Main places

Politics 
The municipal council consists of seventy-one members elected by mixed-member proportional representation. Thirty-six councillors are elected by first-past-the-post voting in thirty-six wards, while the remaining thirty-five are chosen from party lists so that the total number of party representatives is proportional to the number of votes received. In the election of 3 August 2016 the African National Congress (ANC) won a majority of sixty seats on the council.
The following table shows the results of the election.

Business 
With the establishment of the new municipality called Collins Chabane Local Municipality in Vhembe District, Limpopo, a new business chamber called “Collins Chabane Chamber of Business ” was also established and launched formerly in August 2017. Collins Chabane Chamber of Business (CCCB) is a Non-profit  organization formed by the coming together of the already existing business Forums in Malamulele and Hlanganani-Vuwani areas to form a formidable entity on a municipal level, while maintaining their original and distinct purposes of driving business on an area and nodal-point levels. The former two forums have now become local area forums within the Collins Chabane Chamber of Business. The Chamber of business is responsible for the authentication of local businesses and the protection of member's rights and benefits within the local empowerment drive.

A Chamber of Business is a form of an independent, non-political, subscription-based association or business network, e.g., a local organization of businesses whose goal is to further the interests of businesses. Business owners in towns and cities form these local societies to advocate on behalf of the business community. The chamber of Business is an organization of citizens who are investing their time and money in a community development program-working together to improve the economic, civic, and cultural wellbeing of the area. 
There are two primary functions of a chamber of Business: first, it acts as a spokesman for the business and professional community and translates the group thinking of its members into action; secondly, it renders a specific product or services type that can be most effectively be beneficial by a community organization and to its members as a whole.

The Collins Chabane Chamber of Business is divided into two local forums (Malamulele and Hlanganai-Vuwani) and seven (7) nodal points (or economic hubs). The Malamulele local area consists of five nodal points, while Hlanganani-Vuwani local area has two nodal points. The chamber has a board of Directors consisting of members from the local areas, while the local areas has an executive consisting of members from their nodal points. Local businesses are the members that elect the local forums’ executives, and the executives elect the board of directors to set policy/constitution for the chambers. 
The chamber also has eight (8) Desks  to facilitate the ease of doing business as follows: 1) Services Desk, 2) infrastructure Desk, 3) Women, Youth and Disability Desk, 4) Enterprise & development Desk, 5) Compliance Desk, 6) event & Tourism desk, 7) Human Resource Desk and 8) Tender & Procurement Desk. Known as the Action Arm of the Business Chamber, the Desks are the enablers of creating an environment for business to grow in and addressing inhibiting factors impacting business. The Chamber also has a Council, consisting of representatives of various associations or economic sectors.

The Collins Chabane Chamber of Business is structures to have a 7-member Executive Board who are part of a 16-member Board of directors which is also part of a Council, and the Leadership as of 2017 is as follows:

President (CEO)				: Jeleni A, 
Deputy President (COO)			: Nkwinika FM, 
Treasurer General (CFO)			: Mathebula ME, 
Secretary General (CS)			: Mabasa B, 
Deputy Secretary General (OM)		: Maboya RA, 
Enterprise Development Desk Officer 	: Ramolifho E, 
Public Relations Officer		: Chauke TT, 
Development and Planning Officer	: Khosa MP, 
Data and Administration Officer		: Mazibuko T, 
Services Desk Officer			: Mudau T,  
Infrastructure Desk Officer		: GV Baloyi, 
Women Disability and Youth Desk Officer	: Mayimele M,  
Compliance Desk Officer			: Chabalala D, 
Event Desk  and Tourism Officer		: Mulaudzi R, 
Human Resource Desk Officer		: Maluleke R, 
Procurement/Tender Desk Officer		: Masingi NA.

References

Local municipalities of the Vhembe District Municipality